Mario Tabio Teheran (born 7 June 1942) is a Cuban rower. He competed at the 1964 and the 1968 Summer Olympics.

References

1942 births
Living people
Cuban male rowers
Olympic rowers of Cuba
Rowers at the 1964 Summer Olympics
Rowers at the 1968 Summer Olympics
Sportspeople from Havana
Rowers at the 1967 Pan American Games
Pan American Games medalists in rowing
Pan American Games bronze medalists for Cuba
Medalists at the 1967 Pan American Games